Same-sex marriage in Northern Ireland has been legal since 13 January 2020, following the enactment of the Northern Ireland (Executive Formation etc) Act 2019. The first marriage ceremony took place on 11 February 2020. Civil partnerships have also been available for same-sex couples in Northern Ireland since their introduction by the Government of the United Kingdom in 2005.

Between 2012 and 2015, the Northern Ireland Assembly voted five times on same-sex marriage, and although it was passed by a slim majority on the fifth attempt, it was vetoed by the Democratic Unionist Party using the petition of concern. Following the inconclusive 2017 Assembly election and failure to form a Northern Ireland Executive by the deadline of 21 October 2019, provisions in the Northern Ireland (Executive Formation etc) Act 2019 mandating same-sex marriage by 13 January 2020 took effect. Regulations implementing same-sex marriage were signed by Julian Smith, Secretary of State for Northern Ireland, on 19 December 2019. The politician who introduced the 13 January 2020 deadline into the legislation, Baron Hayward, did so in order to allow enough time to update all legislation impacted by the change, such as pension rights and parental responsibilities. Marriages of same-sex couples became legally recognised on 13 January 2020, with couples free to register their intent to marry and couples who had previously married elsewhere having their unions recognised from that date.

Civil partnerships

Civil partnerships have been available to same-sex couples in Northern Ireland since 2005, following the passage of the Civil Partnership Act 2004 in the UK Parliament. The Act gives same-sex couples most, but not all, of the same rights and responsibilities as civil marriage. Civil partners are entitled to the same property rights as married opposite-sex couples, the same exemption as married couples on inheritance tax, social security and pension benefits, and also the ability to get parental responsibility for a partner's children, as well as responsibility for reasonable maintenance of one's partner and their children, tenancy rights, full life insurance recognition, next of kin rights in hospitals, and others. There is a formal process for dissolving partnerships akin to divorce. Civil partnerships can be conducted by religious organisations in England, Wales and Scotland but not in Northern Ireland.

Civil partnerships were opened to different-sex couples following the passage of the Marriage (Same-sex Couples) and Civil Partnership (Opposite-sex Couples) (Northern Ireland) Regulations 2019.

Same-sex marriage

Marriage in Northern Ireland is subject to laws in force at the time. There is no obligation for either of those being married to belong to a religious denomination, or for the marriage to be carried out by a religious institution, but marriages carried out in the prescribed form by a religious denomination and registered by an authorised celebrant are recognised by the state.

Northern Ireland Assembly proposals
Legislation to allow for the recognition of same-sex marriages in Northern Ireland was debated five times in the Northern Ireland Assembly between 2012 and 2015. On the first four of those occasions, only a minority of Assembly members voted in favour of same-sex marriage, though the last vote on the issue in November 2015 saw a majority of MLAs vote in favour of same-sex marriage.

On 1 October 2012, the first Northern Ireland Assembly motion regarding same-sex marriage was introduced by Sinn Féin and the Greens. The motion was defeated 50–45. On 29 April 2013, a second attempt to introduce same-sex marriage was defeated by the Assembly 53–42, with the Democratic Unionist Party (DUP) and the Ulster Unionist Party (UUP) voting against and Sinn Féin, the Social Democratic and Labour Party (SDLP), the Alliance Party, and the Green Party voting in favour.

A third attempt on 29 April 2014 was defeated 51–43, with all nationalist MLAs (Sinn Féin and SDLP), most Alliance MPs and four unionists (two from NI21 and two from the UUP) voting in favour. The remaining unionists (DUP, UUP, UKIP and Traditional Unionist Voice) and two Alliance MLAs voted against. A fourth attempt on 27 April 2015 also failed, 49–47. Again, Sinn Féin, SDLP and five Alliance members voted in favour, while the DUP and all but four of the UUP members (who were granted a conscience vote) voted against.

On 2 November 2015, the Northern Ireland Assembly voted for a fifth time on the question of legalising same-sex marriage. Of the 105 legislators who voted, 53 were in favour and 52 against, the first time a majority of the Assembly had ever voted in favour of same-sex marriage. However, the DUP again tabled a petition of concern signed by 32 members, preventing the motion from having any legal effect.

Sinn Féin said that legislation regarding same-sex marriage would be a priority for the party in the Assembly elected in May 2016. On 23 June 2016, Finance Minister Máirtín Ó Muilleoir announced he had requested that officials in the Executive begin drafting legislation to allow same-sex marriage, stating that MLAs would much rather vote on the issue than "be forced to legislate [following] an adverse judgment" in the courts. In October 2016, First Minister Arlene Foster reaffirmed the DUP's opposition to same-sex marriage, saying the party would continue to issue a petition of concern blocking same-sex marriage in the Assembly over the next five years. The DUP won fewer than 30 seats at the March 2017 elections, losing the ability to singlehandedly block a bill using a petition of concern. The Assembly failed to reconvene for nearly three years following the election, with same-sex marriage and other issues being sources of disagreement between the major parties.

United Kingdom Parliament

2018 proposals
Karen Bradley, the Secretary of State for Northern Ireland, said in February 2018 that same-sex marriage could be legislated for in Northern Ireland by the Parliament of the United Kingdom, and that the government would likely allow a conscience vote for its MPs if such legislation was introduced. Labour MP Conor McGinn said he would introduce a private member's bill extending same-sex marriage to Northern Ireland by the end of March 2018. Legislation to legalise same-sex marriage was introduced to the House of Commons on 28 March 2018, and passed its first reading. The bill's second reading in the Commons was blocked by Conservative MP Christopher Chope on 11 May 2018, and again on 26 October, and was rescheduled for debate on 23 November 2018, before being again rescheduled to 25 January 2019. An identical bill was introduced to the House of Lords on 27 March 2018 by Baron Hayward, and passed its first reading that day, though without government support.

On 1 November 2018, royal assent was granted to the Northern Ireland (Executive Formation and Exercise of Functions) Act 2018, which contained sections describing Northern Ireland's same-sex marriage and abortion bans as human rights violations. The law did not legalise same-sex marriage in Northern Ireland, but directed the British Government to "issue guidance" to civil servants in Northern Ireland "in relation to the incompatibility of human rights with [the region's laws on the two issues]". The law passed 207–117 in the House of Commons.

Legalisation by Westminster (2019)

In March 2019, Baron Hayward introduced an amendment to an unrelated government bill, which if accepted would have extended same-sex marriage to Northern Ireland. Baroness Williams of Trafford opposed the amendment and said the UK Government wanted the Northern Ireland Assembly to legalise same-sex marriage. Hayward withdrew it, stating that he and other Lords "made a tactical withdrawal today, but we will be back, this time to win".

In July 2019, McGinn announced his intention to attach an amendment to an upcoming Northern Ireland administrative bill, which would legalise same-sex marriage three months after passage of the bill if the Northern Ireland Assembly remained suspended. Under the terms of the originally-drafted amendment, the region's executive could approve or repeal the measure upon resumption. The amendment passed on 9 July in the House of Commons with 383 votes in favour and 73 votes against. McGinn's amendment, which was further amended by Lord Hayward during passage in the House of Lords on 17 July, was approved without a formal vote. It required the Secretary of State to issue regulations extending same-sex marriage to Northern Ireland if the Executive had not reconvened by 21 October 2019. If this occurred, then the regulations would come into effect on 13 January 2020. Lord Hayward's amendment was approved in the House of Commons with 328 votes in favour and 65 votes against on 18 July. The bill passed its final stages in the Parliament and received royal assent by Queen Elizabeth II on 24 July 2019, becoming the Northern Ireland (Executive Formation etc) Act 2019.

Attempted recall of Northern Ireland Assembly (2019)
On 21 October 2019, the Democratic Unionist Party (DUP) and the Traditional Unionist Voice petitioned to call the Assembly back into session for the first time in nearly three years. However, Sinn Féin, the Alliance Party, the Greens and People Before Profit announced their abstention from the Assembly, and the Social Democratic and Labour Party walked out of the Assembly session, leading to the absence of all nationalist MLAs and the lack of a cross-community quorum for electing a new speaker. Incumbent Speaker Robin Newton refused to suspend the rules to allow an anti-abortion bill and a potential anti-same-sex marriage bill to be brought to a floor vote, leading the DUP to walk out of the Assembly and end the session. As a result, the Westminster deadline for overturning the introduction of same-sex marriage in Northern Ireland under the Northern Ireland (Executive Formation etc) Act 2019 passed at midnight on 21 October 2019, with abortion becoming legal and the Secretary of State required to issue regulations extending same-sex marriage to Northern Ireland. The Marriage (Same-sex Couples) and Civil Partnership (Opposite-sex Couples) (Northern Ireland) Regulations 2019 were signed by Secretary of State Julian Smith on 19 December 2019 and came into effect on 13 January 2020.

Commencement of marriages
The first same-sex couple in Northern Ireland to legally marry under the new law were Robyn Peoples and Sharni Edwards-Peoples on 11 February 2020 in Belfast. Connor Phillips and Shane Robinson were the first male couple to marry in Northern Ireland on 12 February in Newcastle, County Down.

Marriage ceremonies of same-sex couples in religious facilities became permitted in early September 2020, after subsidiary legislation was passed by the Northern Ireland Office. The legislation contains exemptions and protections for religious bodies and officiants that do not wish to conduct same-sex marriages. The first religious same-sex marriage ceremony was performed on 12 December 2020 in Carrickfergus. The officiant was Pastor Steve Ames of the Harbour Faith Community.

Regulations to enable those in civil partnerships to convert their relationship status to marriage were laid in Parliament on 22 October 2020, with the first conversions taking place from 7 December 2020.

Court challenges

Before 2019 Westminster legalisation
Two legal challenges to Northern Ireland's same-sex marriage ban were heard in the High Court in November and December 2015. Two couples, Grainne Close and Shannon Sickles and Chris and Henry Flanagan-Kanem, brought the case claiming that Northern Ireland's prohibition on same-sex marriage breached their human rights. The case was heard simultaneously with a case brought in January 2015 in which two men who wed in England sought to have their marriage recognised in Northern Ireland. A ruling was handed down in August 2017; Judge John Ailbe O'Hara of the High Court found against the couples and determined that there were no grounds under case law from the European Court of Human Rights that the couples' rights were violated by Northern Ireland's refusal to recognise their union as a marriage and that same-sex marriage was a matter of social policy for the Parliament to decide rather than the judiciary.

One of the couples involved in the litigation (who were granted anonymity) said they would appeal the ruling. The appeal was heard by a three-judge panel of the Court of Appeal on 16 March 2018; a ruling had been expected some time in 2019. On 7 April 2020, the Court of Appeal in Belfast ruled that same-sex couples faced unjustified discrimination while denied the opportunity to marry in Northern Ireland. But with changes to the law meaning same-sex weddings can take place in Northern Ireland since 11 February 2020, senior judges decided not to make a formal declaration on any human rights breach.

After 2019 Westminster legalisation 
In 2019, two same-sex couples indicated they would sue the UK Government over bureaucratic obstacles that may have forced them to wait two years before being capable of converting their civil partnerships into marriages. The issue was rectified by further regulations which came into effect in December 2020.

Statistics

Civil partnerships
According to the Northern Ireland Statistics and Research Agency (NISRA), 1,436 same-sex civil partnerships were registered between 2005 and 2021. The data is shown in the table below.

Most civil partnerships were conducted in Belfast, the city accounting for about half of all Northern Irish partnerships, followed by Derry City and Strabane, and Newry, Mourne and Down. Mid Ulster and Antrim and Newtownabbey registered the fewest partnerships. In 2015, the average age for men entering civil partnerships was 33.8, whereas for women it was 36.8 (34.3 and 32.2 respectively for married opposite-sex partners). There were seven partnership dissolutions in 2015 (five to male couples and two to lesbian couples), compared to 2,360 divorces.

Marriage
158 same-sex marriages were performed in Northern Ireland in 2020. This constituted 4.2 percent of the total number of marriages performed in Northern Ireland during that period. This increased to 398 same-sex marriages in 2021.

Public opinion
A September 2014 LucidTalk poll for the Belfast Telegraph showed that 40.1% of the population supported same-sex marriage, while 39.4% opposed and 20.5% either had or stated no opinion. Of those that gave an opinion, 50.5% supported and 49.5% opposed same-sex marriage. A poll in May 2015 found that 68% of the population supported same-sex marriage, with support rising to 75% in Belfast. A "mass rally", organised by the Irish Congress of Trade Unions, Amnesty International, and the Rainbow Project took place in Belfast on 13 June 2015, with a 20,000 person turnout. A June 2016 poll placed support for same-sex marriage at 70%, while those opposing it at 22%.

A December 2016 LucidTalk poll found that 65.22% of people surveyed supported the legalisation of same-sex marriage in Northern Ireland. However, a majority of unionist respondents was opposed to same-sex marriage in Northern Ireland, with only 37.04% in favour (with support rising to 71% for unionists aged between 18 and 24 years of age). By contrast, 92.92% of nationalist respondents and 95.75% of Alliance/Green/PBP voters were in favour.

An April 2018 Sky Data poll placed support for same-sex marriage in Northern Ireland at 76%, with 18% opposed.

A 2019 poll conducted by YouGov revealed that 70% of British people agreed that same-sex marriage should be legalised in Northern Ireland (up from 65% in 2018), including 55% of those living in Northern Ireland. Among Conservative voters, 62% (up from 54% in 2018) expressed support for the introduction of same-sex marriage in Northern Ireland. 81% of "Remain" voters said they supported same-sex marriage, compared to 60% of "Leave" voters (this was at a time when in the aftermath of the 2016 EU referendum the issue of Brexit dominated British politics). In Northern Ireland itself, 72% of women supported same-sex marriage, compared to 40% of men.

Position of Christian and secular groups 
The main churches in Northern Ireland define marriage as between one man and one woman, and do not support same-sex marriage. The majority of marriages in Northern Ireland are also conducted by religious denominations, e.g. 4,407 out of 7,255 marriage ceremonies in 2019 (61%). By contrast, secular humanists in Northern Ireland have been conducting partnership ceremonies for same-sex couples in Northern Ireland for many years. Northern Ireland Humanists, the Northern Irish section of Humanists UK, welcomed the introduction of same-sex marriage and said it was looking forward to conducting official ceremonies.

Religious same-sex marriage ceremonies have been possible since 1 September 2020. Regulations to permit religious institutions to perform legally recognised same-sex marriages and to provide exemptions and protections for religious bodies that do not wish to conduct such marriages were enacted in July 2020 and took effect two months later.

Under the Marriage (Northern Ireland) Order 2003, an officiant shall not solemnise a religious marriage "except in accordance with a form of ceremony which is recognised by the religious body of which he is a member" and which "includes and is in no way inconsistent with" an appropriate declaration i.e. that they accept each other as spouses in the presence of each other, the officiant, and two witnesses. A religious body is defined in legislation as "an organised group of people meeting regularly for common religious worship".

 Within the Catholic Church, the Catechism of the Catholic Church states: "The matrimonial covenant, by which a man and a woman establish between themselves a partnership of the whole of life, is by its nature ordered toward the good of the spouses and the procreation and education of offspring."
 The Presbyterian Church in Ireland subscribes to the Westminster Confession of Faith which affirms that marriage "is to be between one man and one woman: neither is it lawful for any man to have more than one wife, nor for any woman to have more than one husband, at the same time".
 The Church of Ireland affirms in its canon law that "according to our Lord's teaching that marriage is in its purpose a union permanent and life-long, for better or worse, till death do them part, of one man with one woman, to the exclusion of all others on either side". In 2012, the General Synod of the Church of Ireland reaffirmed this teaching in a motion on "Human Sexuality in the Context of Christian Belief". The motion added that the church "recognises for itself and of itself, no other understanding of marriage" and acknowledged that members of the church "have at times hurt and wounded people by words and actions, in relation to human sexuality". The church affirmed a "continuing commitment to love our neighbour, and opposition to all unbiblical and uncharitable actions and attitudes in respect of human sexuality from whatever perspective, including bigotry, hurtful words or actions, and demeaning or damaging language".
 The Methodist Church in Ireland states that marriage is "a relationship, intended as permanent, between one man and one woman" in its "Practical Expressions of Methodist Belief" document. The church opposes "all debased forms of sexuality and sexual practice, whether heterosexual or homosexual" but asks for "understanding and tolerance for those whose sexual orientation is towards those of their own gender" and encourages the wider church "to give a greater lead in the education of society, including Christians, regarding this issue, so that ignorance, prejudice and fear may disappear".
 The Association of Baptist Churches in Ireland affirms "the creation ordinance of marriage as the lifelong union of one man and one woman" in its Doctrinal Statement.
 The Congregational Union of Ireland affirms the Savoy Declaration, which is similar to the Westminster Confession of Faith in stating that "marriage is to be between one man and one woman: neither is it lawful for any man to have more than one wife, nor for any woman to have more than one husband at the same time".
 The Salvation Army – as stated in its "Marriage Positional Statement" – believes that marriage is "an exclusive and lifelong relationship between one man and one woman which is characterised by mutual submission, respect, self-giving love, faithfulness and openness to each other". It adds that human imperfection and sinfulness "may make it difficult to reach the goal of lifelong faithfulness" and that the Christian ideal of marriage is compromised by breakdown, separation and divorce, cohabitation, forced marriage, same-sex partnerships and polygamy. However, the Salvation Army "does not condemn or abandon people who fall short of the ideal" but rather, in God's name, it seeks to offer support, reconciliation, counsel, grace and forgiveness.
 The Reformed Presbyterian Church of Ireland, the Evangelical Presbyterian Church and the Free Presbyterian Church of Ulster subscribe to the Westminster Confession of Faith and its definition of marriage.
 The Quakers in Northern Ireland perform same-sex marriages. In 2018, a motion supporting and allowing such marriages in their meeting houses was passed at an annual yearly meeting held in Limerick. The Quakers are the only mainstream church in Northern Ireland that allows same-sex marriages.

See also

 LGBT rights in Northern Ireland
 Same-sex marriage in the United Kingdom
 Same-sex marriage in the Republic of Ireland
 Recognition of same-sex unions in Europe
 Recognition of same-sex unions in the British Overseas Territories
 Same-sex union court cases

References

Northern Ireland
LGBT rights in Northern Ireland
2020 in LGBT history